In botany, an umbel is an inflorescence that consists of a number of short flower stalks (called pedicels) that spread from a common point, somewhat like umbrella ribs. The word was coined in botanical usage in the 1590s, from Latin umbella "parasol, sunshade". The arrangement can vary from being flat-topped to almost spherical. Umbels can be simple or compound. The secondary umbels of compound umbels are known as umbellules or umbellets. A small umbel is called an umbellule. The arrangement of the inflorescence in umbels is referred to as umbellate, or occasionally subumbellate (almost umbellate).

Umbels are a characteristic of plants such as carrot, parsley, dill, and fennel in the family Apiaceae; ivy, Aralia and Fatsia in the family Araliaceae; and onion (Allium) in the family Alliaceae.

An umbel is a type of indeterminate inflorescence.
A compressed cyme, which is a determinate inflorescence, is called umbelliform if it resembles an umbel.

Gallery

References

Further reading

Apiales
Plant morphology